The House Of Blue Lights was the name given to a house on the far northeast side of Indianapolis, Indiana, US. Decorated year round with blue Christmas lights, it was actually the home of eccentric Indianapolis millionaire Skiles Edward Test. It gained a reputation for being haunted.

Background

According to local folklore, Skiles' deceased wife was embalmed in a glass coffin inside the house, surrounded by the eerie blue lights. Test himself encouraged the rumors when he began burying the remains of some of his 109 pet cats in carpeted caskets under brass nameplates. After Test's death, no evidence was discovered that indicated his wife had been buried on the property, for, in fact, he had been married three times and all three women survived him. The public sale at auction of the possessions from the property did enhance the rumors of his eccentric later life. Nevertheless, the house was widely regarded as a "haunted" site well past Skiles' death in 1964 and is still recognized in the folklore and culture of Indianapolis.

The house itself was originally of wood-frame construction, with a full exterior façade of white opaque glass brick. Many additions to the original farm house included glass solarium/greenhouses, and numerous lightning rods on the roof. A unique feature of the Test estate was an  swimming pool with a three-story diving tower and motorized surfboard pulley system, and alongside of the pool, an ornate brick "pool house" with guest quarters. The solar-heated pool circulated its water through aboveground pipes that were heated in the sun and recirculated in the pool to keep the water warm.

Following the death of Skiles, his heirs bequeathed the property to the City of Indianapolis in 1974. Most of the structures remained standing but in ill repair until the Parks Department decided to demolish them all in 1978, despite public protest and interest by the Historic Landmarks Foundation of Indiana. Years later it was developed into a natural resource area called the Skiles Test Nature Park.  

The legend of the house was the subject of a gothic comedy play, The Creeper of the House of Blue Lights, which was performed by the Stage Actors Workshop in Indianapolis in October 2007.

References

Further reading
Baker, Ronald L. Hoosier Folk Legends. Indiana University Press. 1982. .
Degh, Linda. Legend and Belief: Dialectics of a Folklore Genre. Indiana University Press: 15 November 2001. .
Geib, George W. Indianapolis: Hoosiers' Circle City copyright 1981, .
Kobrowski, Nicole Encyclopedia of Haunted Indiana copyright 2008, .
Miclot, Kay Joy. Skiles Test and the House of Blue Lights. Publisher: Miclot, 1975. ASIN: B0006X4IZ4.
Neville, Susan. In the House of Blue Lights. Notre Dame: University of Notre Dame Press, 1998.

External links
House of Blue Lights by Skiles Test's daughter
Memories of Skiles Test and the House of Blue Lights by Patricia Hicks

Reportedly haunted locations in Indiana
Tourist attractions in Indianapolis
Houses in Indianapolis
Residential buildings in Indianapolis